The 2017 European Figure Skating Championships were held 25–29 January 2017 in Ostrava, Czech Republic. Medals were awarded in the disciplines of men's singles, ladies' singles, pairs, and ice dancing.

Records
For complete list of figure skating records, see list of highest scores in figure skating.

The following new ISU best scores were set during this competition:

Eligibility 
Skaters were eligible for the event if they represented a European member nation of the International Skating Union and had reached the age of 15 before July 1, 2016, in their place of birth. The corresponding competition for non-European skaters is the 2017 Four Continents Championships. National associations selected their entries according to their own criteria but the ISU mandated that their selections achieve a minimum technical elements score (TES) at an international event prior to the European Championships.

Minimum TES

Number of entries per discipline 
Based on the results of the 2016 European Championships, the ISU allows each country one to three entries per discipline.

Entries 
National associations began announcing their selections in December 2016. The ISU published a complete list on 4 January 2017:

Changes to initial assignments

Results

Men
Fernandez won his fifth European title.

Ladies
Evgenia Medvedeva won her second European title. Medvedeva set a new world record for the free skating (150.79 points) and for the combined total (229.71 points).

Pairs
Bronze medalists the previous two years, Tarasova/Morozov won their first European title after placing first in the short program and second in the free skate. Ranked third in the short and first in the free, Savchenko/Massot received silver for the second consecutive year. Bronze medalists James/Ciprès were the first French pair to win a European medal in fourteen years (since 2003, when Sarah Abitbol / Stéphane Bernadis took silver).

Ice dancing
Papadakis/Cizeron became European champions for the third consecutive year.

Medals summary

Medals by country 
Table of medals for overall placement:

Table of small medals for placement in the short segment:

Table of small medals for placement in the free segment:

Medalists 
Medals for overall placement

Small medals for placement in the short segment

Small medals for placement in the free segment

References

External links
 
 
 2017 European Championships at the International Skating Union

2017
2017 in figure skating
International figure skating competitions hosted by the Czech Republic
2017 in Czech sport
Sport in Ostrava
Figure Skating Championships